
Gmina Janów Lubelski is an urban-rural gmina (administrative district) in Janów Lubelski County, Lublin Voivodeship, in eastern Poland.

Villages
Apart from the town of Janów Lubelski, Gmina Janów Lubelski contains the villages and settlements of Biała Druga, Biała Pierwsza, Borownica, Cegielnia, Jonaki, Kiszki, Kopce, Łążek Garncarski, Łążek Ordynacki, Momoty Dolne, Momoty Górne, Pikule, Ruda, Szewce, Szklarnia, Ujście and Zofianka Górna.

Neighbouring gminas
Gmina Janów Lubelski is bordered by the gminas of Biłgoraj, Dzwola, Godziszów, Harasiuki, Jarocin, Modliborzyce and Pysznica.

References

Polish official population figures 2006

Janow Lubelski
Janów Lubelski County